The 1992–93 DFB-Pokal was the 50th season of the annual German football cup competition. 83 teams competed in the tournament of seven rounds which began on 18 August 1992 and ended on 12 June 1993. In the final Bayer Leverkusen defeated the second team of Hertha Berlin 1–0. It was the first time a third-tier team made it to the DFB-Pokal final, and the only time a reserve team has.

Matches

First round

Second round

Third round

Round of 16

Quarter-finals

Semi-finals

Final

References

External links
 Official site of the DFB 
 /official site of the DFB english version
 Kicker.de 

1992-93
1992–93 in German football cups